The 2018–19 Missouri Tigers men's basketball team represented the University of Missouri in the 2018–19 NCAA Division I men's basketball season. They were led by head coach Cuonzo Martin in his second year at Missouri. The team played its home games at Mizzou Arena in Columbia, Missouri as seventh-year members of the Southeastern Conference. They finished the season 15–17 overall, 5–13 in the SEC to finish in 12th place.

Previous season
The Tigers finished the 2017–18 season 20–13, 10–8 in SEC play to finish in a tie for fourth place. As the No. 5 seed in the SEC tournament, they lost to the Georgia Bulldogs in the second round. The Tigers received an at-large bid to the NCAA tournament as the No. 8 seed in the West region. The Tigers lost in the First Round to Florida State.

Offseason
On March 26, 2018, Michael Porter Jr. announced he would declare for the 2018 NBA draft and would forgo his final years of eligibility by signing with an agent. On April 5, his younger brother Jontay Porter also declared for the NBA draft, but did not sign with an agent. Shortly before the deadline to withdraw from the draft, the younger Porter did so and will return for his sophomore year.

Departures

Incoming transfers

2018 recruiting class

Roster

Schedule and results

|-
!colspan=12 style=| Non-conference regular season

|-
!colspan=12 style=|SEC regular season

|-
!colspan=12 style=| SEC Tournament

|-

References

Missouri
Missouri Tigers men's basketball seasons